Ralph R. Cloyed (July 26, 1898/1902 – April 19, 1955) was an American politician. He served as a Republican member for the 80th district of the California State Assembly.

Life and career 
Cloyed was born in Monroe County, Iowa.

In 1951, Cloyed was elected to represent the 80th district of the California State Assembly, succeeding Howard K. Cramer. He served until 1955, when he was succeeded by Jack Schrade.

Cloyed died in April 1955 in San Diego, California.

References 

Year of birth uncertain
1955 deaths
People from Monroe County, Iowa
Republican Party members of the California State Assembly
20th-century American politicians